Joanna Marie Valentina "Zizi" Lambrino (3 October 1898 – 11 March 1953) was the first wife of the later King Carol II of Romania. They had one son, Carol, born in 1920, in Bucharest.

Life
Born in the former Byzantine, Phanariot Rangabe-Lambrino family, the daughter of Romanian Colonel, later General, Constantin Lambrino and Euphrosine Alcaz, Joanna Lambrino met the Hohenzollern Prince Carol, son of King Ferdinand of Romania and Queen Marie of Romania, in Iaşi, Romania, in 1918, during the First World War. The Romanian royal court had adjourned from Bucharest to Iaşi, to keep its distance from a German invasion. Journalist A.L. Easterman would later write that "Carol fell violently in love and was at no pains to dissemble it", despite the obvious disapproval of the royal court for his bestowing his affections on a commoner. Even so, there are several photographs of Zizi Lambrino and Prince Carol at the Royal family residences and together with other members of the Romanian Royal family. Lulu, Zizi's brother, was one of Carol's best friends and they corresponded with each other throughout their lives.

Some say their union was opposed by his parents, but Carol "smuggled" her across the former Russian frontier and they were officially married in the Orthodox Cathedral of Odessa, Ukraine, on 31 August 1918, in the presence of witnesses. Carol's parents were furious. The king ordered him to be kept in close confinement in Bistrița Monastery for seventy-five days. Prime Minister Ion I. C. Brătianu practically accused Carol of treason. Prince Carol threatened to renounce his right of royal succession and, indeed, when in August 1919 the Romanian Supreme Court ruled the marriage unconstitutional, unlawful and annulled it, Carol signed documents of renunciation.  However, as Easterman describes it, "intriguers... cunningly... [threw] other young and attractive women in his view and society" and eventually "corroded his relations with his wife..."

Carol and Zizi Lambrino had one son, Mircea Gregor Carol Lambrino (8 August 1920 – 27 January 2006). Carol and the Romanian government continued to pay Lambrino's maintenance and that of her son in their French exile.

Zizi Lambrino died in Neuilly-sur-Seine, near Paris, France, on 11 March 1953. Her former husband, the now ex-King Carol II, died in exile in Estoril, Portugal shortly after on 4 April 1953.

Archives
Zizi Lambrino's personal papers (including diaries, correspondence and photographs related to her marriage to Carol II of Romania) are preserved in the "Jeanne Marie Valentine Lambrino Papers" collection in the Hoover Institution Archives (Stanford, California, US).

Descendants

Her son, Mircea Gregor Carol Lambrino, was named in memory of Prince Mircea of Romania (1913–1916), Carol's youngest brother, who had died four years previous to the former's birth, but he would later be known as "Carol" rather than "Mircea." Mircea/Carol married three times, firstly (1944-1950) to Opera singer Hélène Nagavitzine (aka. Léna Pastor); they had one son, Paul-Philippe Hohenzollern. He next married Jeanne Williams (1960-1977); they had one son, Ion Nicolas George Alexander Hohenzollern (born 1961 in Dorset, England). He married his third wife, Antonia Colville, in 1984 and they remained married until he died in 2006.

In response to a suit by her grandson Paul, a Romanian Court determined in 1996 that her marriage was legal. This places a shadow over the status of Carol II's son, the de facto King of Romania Michael, because if Carol's marriage to Zizi Lambrino was never properly ended, that could invalidate his later royal marriage to Helen of Greece and Denmark, Michael's mother.

ChivalricOrders.org sees this shadow as very slight: "The legality of the annulment of the marriage was not only unchallenged at the time, but significantly, after eventually becoming King, Carol II did not attempt to undo this act nor declare his son Mircea legitimate. Neither did he ever name Mircea as his heir..."; further, "the annulment" although contested by Carol at the time was "... eventually acknowledged by Carol II himself who remarried twice."

Notes
 Easterman, 1942, 33.
 Easterman, 1942, 33–34.
 Easterman, 1942, 34.
 Easterman, 1942, 34–35.
 ChivalricOrders.org for the name of her son. 
 ChivalricOrders.org.
 Simpson, p. A-4. This is citation only for the date of the court decision.

References
 Easterman, A.L., King Carol, Hitler and Lupescu. London: Victor Gollancz Ltd., 1942.
 "Prince Paul of Romania" on ChivalricOrders.org. The quotation marks are part of the title; on their page Fantasy Royalty: Usurpers, Imposters, Illegal Claims they describe him as an "illegal claimant". Accessed 29 November 2005.
 
Marlene A. Eilers, "Queen Victoria's Descendants". Baltimore, Maryland: Genealogical Publishing Co., 1987

Notes

1898 births
1953 deaths
House of Hohenzollern-Sigmaringen
People from Roman, Romania
People from Neuilly-sur-Seine